Clarendon Street Junction is a tram stop located at the intersection of the St Kilda and Port Melbourne light rails with Normanby Road, Whiteman and Clarendon Streets in Southbank, Victoria. It is served by Yarra Trams routes 96 and 109 on the Melbourne tram network. It was also the terminus for the Colonial Tramcar Restaurant.

The original stop of two side platforms was opened in 1987 as an unnamed station, when the Port Melbourne and St Kilda railway lines were converted for tram operation. Sometime during the early 1990s an unofficial sign was erected at the site of the station with the name, "Port Junction." This caught on and eventually became official. In January 2016 it was rebuilt with an island platform and separate platform for the Colonial Tramcar Restaurant. At the same time it was renamed Clarendon Street Junction.

Tram services
Yarra Trams operates two routes via Clarendon Street Junction:
 : East Brunswick – St Kilda Beach
 : Box Hill – Port Melbourne

References

External links

Road junctions in Australia
Southbank, Victoria
Transport in the City of Melbourne (LGA)
Tram stops in Melbourne
Transport infrastructure completed in 1987
1987 establishments in Australia